Senecio garlandii, commonly known as woolly ragwort, is a species of daisy native to southern New South Wales and north-eastern Victoria.

Description
The stems and lower leaf surface are densely covered with white, cottony hairs, whilst the leaves grow to 15 cm long and 8 cm wide, with toothed edges. The leaves are stalkless, and clasp the stem. The numerous small flower heads are clustered in sprays, and mature into light brown fruits that are grooved and covered with slender white hairs.

Distribution and habitat
The species occurs in dry schlerophyll forests and open woodlands, on the sheltered south and east facing slopes of rocky outcrops between Wyalong, NSW to Chiltern, Victoria. The species is capable of regenerating in both the absence and presence of fire, however fire facilitates
germination and some resprouting occurs after fire.

Conservation status

Australia
Woolly ragwort was previously listed under the EPBC Act as Vulnerable, but was removed in 2013 after it was reassessed by the Threatened Species Scientific Committee.

NSW
The species is listed as Vulnerable in NSW under the Biodiversity Conservation Act 2016.

VIC
The species is listed as Endangered in Victoria under the Flora and Fauna Guarantee Act 1988.

Conservation actions
Woolly ragwort occurs in several protected areas, including The Rock Nature Reserve, Tabletop Nature Reserve, Benambra National Park and Ulandra Nature Reserve in NSW, and in the Chiltern-Mt Pilot National Park in Victoria.

References

Endemic flora of Australia
garlandii
Taxa named by Ferdinand von Mueller